10th & Osage station (sometimes stylized as 10th•Osage) is a RTD light rail station in Denver, Colorado, United States. Operating as part of the D, E and H Lines, the station was opened on October 8, 1994, and is operated by the Regional Transportation District. This is the northernmost station served by all trains that pass through the I-25 & Broadway station.

It serves a mostly residential neighborhood; however, immediately across the street from the station is a Denver landmark, the Buckhorn Exchange, one of the city's oldest restaurants. Visible to the west of the station, but fenced off from foot traffic, is the Burnham Shops of the Union Pacific Railroad, which was their second largest locomotive facility at the time of the railroad's last merger.

References 

RTD light rail stations in Denver
Railway stations in the United States opened in 1994